Pinch Gut Creek is a tributary of Brown Creek in Anson County, North Carolina that rises southeast of Polkton, North Carolina and then flows south to meet Brown Creek east of Polkton.  The watershed is about 70% forested, 23% agricultural and the rest is of other land uses.

See also
List of North Carolina rivers

References

Rivers of North Carolina
Rivers of Anson County, North Carolina
Tributaries of the Pee Dee River